Alison J. McIntosh is a New Zealand tourism and hospitality academic. Previously a professor at the University of Waikato, she is now a professor at Auckland University of Technology. Her research areas include Critical Tourism and Hospitality, Tourist Behaviour and Heritage and Cultural Tourism.

Selected works 
 McIntosh, Alison J., and Richard C. Prentice. "Affirming authenticity: Consuming cultural heritage." Annals of Tourism Research 26.3 (1999): 589–612.
 Cockburn-Wootten, C., Alison J. McIntosh, Kim Smith and Sharon Jefferies. "Communicating across tourism silos for inclusive sustainable partnerships." Journal of Sustainable Tourism 26.9 (2018): 1483–1498.
 McIntosh, Alison J., and Anne Zahra. "A cultural encounter through volunteer tourism: Towards the ideals of sustainable tourism?." Journal of Sustainable Tourism 15.5 (2007): 541–556.
 Mcintosh, Alison J., and Anna Siggs. "An exploration of the experiential nature of boutique accommodation." Journal of Travel Research 44.1 (2005): 74–81.

References

External links
 
 institutional homepage

Living people
New Zealand women academics
Academic staff of the University of Waikato
Academic staff of the Auckland University of Technology
Year of birth missing (living people)